Hazel Mary Sanders (16 July 1926 – 29 December 1995) was an English cricketer who played as a right-handed batter. She appeared in 12 Test matches for England between 1949 and 1958. She played domestic cricket for Surrey.

Sanders made her debut on England's first post-war tour of Australia and New Zealand in early 1949, reaching 54, her highest Test score, in a victory over New Zealand at Auckland. She scored another half-century, against Australia, at Scarborough in 1951.

Off the field, Sanders was a biochemist, who worked on lipids at the Courtauld Institute of Biochemistry at Middlesex Hospital. She published scientific papers on Lipids and Lipid Metabolism, describing a modification of an existing scientific process using column chromatography to separate and identify lipids from human brain cell matter, allowing phosphatidylserine to be isolated more simply and quickly.

References

External links
 
 

1926 births
1995 deaths
People from Mitcham
England women Test cricketers
Surrey women cricketers
Women biochemists